Jeong Seong-hun may refer to:
 Jung Sung-hoon (born 1968), a former South Korean footballer
 Jeong Shung-hoon (born 1979), a South Korean footballer
 Jeong Seong-hoon (born 1980), a South Korean baseball infielder